The 2001 European Youth Summer Olympic Festival was the sixth edition of multi-sport event for European youths between the ages of 12 and 18. It was held in Murcia, Spain from 22 to 26 July. A total of ten sports were contested. The event received financial support from the Olympic Solidarity programme.

Sports

Venues

Participating nations

Medal table

References

Medal table
Tableau des médailles Murcia - Espagne (2001). French Olympic Committee. Retrieved on 2014-11-23.

External links
Official website

 
2001
European Youth Summer Olympic Festival
European Youth Summer Olympic Festival
European Youth Summer Olympic Festival
Multi-sport events in Spain
Sport in Murcia
Youth sport in Spain
European Youth Summer Olympic Festival
European Youth Summer Olympic Festival